Mawaramandiya is a small village in the Gampaha District of Sri Lanka.

Populated places in Gampaha District